General Sir William Henry Sewell,  (c.1786 – 13 March 1862) was a senior officer in the British Army.

Sewell was of unclear parentage, and according to some reports, was an illegitimate son of the Prince Regent (later George IV). He was raised however by  Robert Sewell and his wife Sarah. He was educated at Westminster School and Eton College under the name of  W.H. Robertson and joined the British Army in 1806 as an ensign in the 96th Foot under the name of William Henry Sewell. He then exchanged to the 16th Light Dragoons and rose through the ranks, via different regiments, to be Lieutenant-Colonel of the 6th Foot in 1817.

He was appointed aide-de-camp to General Beresford, going with him in 1808 to the Peninsular War. He was present with Sir John Moore's army at Corunna, Talavera, Busaco, Nivelle, Nive, Bayonne, Orthes, Toulouse and the sieges of Ciudad Rodrigo, Badajoz, as well as several other minor engagements.

After serving on Lord Beresford's staff in Maida and South America in 1807 he stayed on to command a Portuguese cavalry regiment from 1816 to 1818. Following his return from the Peninsula, he served in India from 1828 to 1854 successively as Deputy Quartermaster General in command at Bangalore, divisional commander at Madras and finally Commander-in-Chief of the Madras Army. He transferred from the 6th Foot to the 94th Foot in 1841 and was made Major-General in that regiment in 1846.

In 1854 he returned to England and was made Colonel for life of the 79th Regiment of Foot (Cameron Highlanders), promoted to Lieutenant-General  and knighted CB. He retired in 1856 and in 1861 was elevated to KCB and promoted full General on 26 November of that year.

He died in Florence in 1862 and was buried at the Protestant Cemetery there. He had married Georgiana Hacking Hamilton, the second daughter of Sir John Hamilton-Dalrymple, 5th Baronet, in 1831 St George's Cathedral, Madras. They had several sons and daughters, of whom Henry Robert and John Dalrymple William also became officers in the Army.

His Great-Grandson, William Fane Sewell, served as a private in the 4th Battalion, Seaforth Highlanders during the Great War. He was killed in Action on 11 March 1915 and has no known grave. He is commemorated on the Le Touret Memorial.

References

1862 deaths
Date of birth uncertain
People educated at Westminster School, London
British Army generals
People educated at Eton College
Knights Commander of the Order of the Bath
96th Regiment of Foot officers
16th The Queen's Lancers officers
Queen's Own Cameron Highlanders officers
British Army personnel of the Napoleonic Wars
Portuguese military officers
Royal Warwickshire Fusiliers officers
Connaught Rangers officers